The 1948 Paris–Brussels was the 34th edition of the Paris–Brussels, a classic one-day cycle race in France and Belgium. The single day event was held on 11 April 1948 and stretched  from Paris to the finish in Brussels.

Results

References

Les-sports.info

1948
1948 in road cycling
1948 in French sport
1948 in Belgian sport
1948 Challenge Desgrange-Colombo